Lacroix-sur-Meuse is a commune in the Meuse department in Grand Est in north-eastern France.

See also
Communes of the Meuse department
Parc naturel régional de Lorraine

References

Lacroixsurmeuse